The Shingini language, is a Kainji language of Nigeria spoken by the Kambari people. Its two dialects are Tsishingini (Salka, Ashaganna) and Cishingini (Chishingini).

Cishingini 
Cishingini, also known as Chishingini or Ashaganna, is spoken in Borgu and Agwara Local Govements of Niger State and in Ngaski LGA of Kebbi State.

References

Kambari languages
Languages of Nigeria